The Hazel Eyes Tour was the second headlining concert tour by American pop singer Kelly Clarkson. It was the second tour launched in support of her sophomore studio album Breakaway (2004), following The Breakaway Tour (2005). The July 17 concert at the UCF Arena in Orlando, Florida was streamed live on AOL and AOL Radio.

Opening acts
Graham Colton Band

Setlist
 "Walk Away"
 "Miss Independent"
 "I Hate Myself for Losing You"
 "Low"
 "What's Up Lonely"
 "The Trouble with Love Is"
 "Addicted"
 "Because of You"
 "Why" 
 "Where is Your Heart"
 "Gone"
 "Come Here"
 "Behind These Hazel Eyes"
 "Beautiful Disaster"
 "Hear Me"
 "Since U Been Gone"
Encore
 "Breakaway"

Notes
"Blue Christmas" was performed during shows in December.

Tour dates

Festivals and other miscellaneous performances
This concert was a part of the "San Diego County Fair"
This concert was a part of "Freedom Blast"
This concert was a part of the "Greeley Stampede"
This concert was a part of "Toms River Fest"

Cancellations and rescheduled shows

Box office score data

References

Concert tours
2005 concert tours